Located most likely on the Aventine Hill, the Forum Pistorium or the forum of the bakers numbered as a forum venalium of ancient Rome. This forum is mentioned only in the Regionary Catalogues as belonging to regio XIII, placing it most likely at the southern end of the Aventine.

References

Pistorium